Salammbô (1862) is a historical novel by Gustave Flaubert. It is set in Carthage immediately before and during the Mercenary Revolt (241–237 BCE). Flaubert's principal  source was Book I of the Histories, written by the Greek historian Polybius. The novel was enormously popular when first published and jumpstarted a renewed interest in the history of the Roman Republic's conflict with the North African Phoenician outpost of Carthage.

Genesis 
After the legal troubles that followed the publication of Madame Bovary, when he was tried and acquitted on charges of "immorality", Flaubert sought a less controversial subject for his next novel. In 1857, Flaubert decided to conduct research in Carthage, writing in March to Félicien de Saulcy, a French archeologist about his plans. In a letter to Madame de Chantepie dated 23 January 1858, he described his anticipation: "I absolutely have to go to Africa. This is why, around the end of March, I will go back to the country of exotic dates. I am giddy with excitement. I will once again spend my days on horseback and my nights in a tent. What a happy breath I will take as I get onboard the steam boat in Marseilles!" From 12 April to 5 June 1858, Flaubert traveled to Tunisia, to explore the locations of his novel, though little survived from ancient times.

Publication
Contemporary readers familiar with Flaubert's previous realistic work, Madame Bovary, and the legal controversy that followed its publication made Salammbô a bestseller, though its violence and sensuality bore little relationship to Flaubert's previous work. It was praised for its style and story. Its descriptions of Carthaginian costume influenced contemporary fashions and the attention it paid to Roman North Africa inspired new interest in archeological exploration there.

Plot

After the First Punic War, Carthage is unable to fulfill promises made to its army of mercenaries, and finds itself under attack. The fictional title character, a priestess and the daughter of Hamilcar Barca, the foremost Carthaginian general, is the object of the obsessive lust of Matho, a leader of the mercenaries. With the help of the scheming freed slave, Spendius, Matho steals the sacred veil of Carthage, the Zaïmph, prompting Salammbô to enter the mercenaries' camp in an attempt to steal it back.  The Zaïmph is an ornate bejewelled veil draped about the statue of the goddess Tanit in the sanctum sanctorum of her temple: the veil is the city's guardian and touching it will bring death to the perpetrator.

 Chapter 1. "The Feast".  "It was at Megara, a suburb of Carthage, in the gardens of Hamilcar." The novel opens on a feast organized to celebrate the victory of the battle of Eryx, won against Rome. During the libations, the mercenaries ransack the place, spurred on by Hamilcar's absence, and the memories of the unkind and unfair way Carthage treated them throughout the war.  Salammbô, Hamilcar's daughter, appears. She scolds them for their actions and entreats them to enjoy the feast without destroying the place. Two men stare at her: Narr' Havas, a troop leader from Numidia and Hamilcar's guest, and Mâtho, a Libyan wearing a necklace with a moon pendent.  The young woman hands Mâtho a glass full of wine and he drinks from it. A Gaulish soldier tells him that, where he is from, it is a sign of betrothal. Jealous, Narr' Havas throws a javelin and wounds him. In the scuffle that ensues, Salammbô retreats to the palace, leaving Mathô wondering. Spendius, a freed slave, tries to persuade Matho to take Carthage for the mercenaries.
 Chapter 2. "At Sicca". Two days, later, after much pleading and promises of payment, the mercenaries agree to leave the city. They walk for seven days and reach the holy city of Sicca. On the way there, a line of crucified lions creates a sense of unease. There, Spendius realizes that Mathô is haunted by the memory of Salammbô, with whom he has fallen in love. The shophet, Hanno, a fat, leprous man, is sent to explain to them that Carthage has no money and will be delaying payment of its debt. Since the shophet only speaks a Punic language, Spendius offers to translate for the army and misrepresents Hanno's message in order to set the mercenaries against him. To make matters worse, Zarxas arrives and relates the treacherous massacre of 300 slingers who had stayed behind. As the dignitary flees in shame, fearing for his life, Spendius convinces the mercenaries to go back to Carthage.
 Chapter 3. "Salammbô". On a moonlit night, Salammbô appears on a palace terrace. She invokes Tanit, the goddess of the moon and the city's tutelary deity, whose moods and phases greatly influence her. Raised within the limits of the palace and destined to a political alliance, Salammbô knows little, but as a priestess of Tanit, she wants to see the statue erected in the temple, in honor of the goddess. Schahabarim, a high priest, forbids it, as the sight of the statue is so powerful it might kill her. From afar, they catch sight of the mercenary army, closing in on Carthage.
 Chapter 4. "Beneath the Walls of Carthage". The mercenaries besiege Carthage; Matho and Spendius penetrate via the aqueduct.
 Chapter 5. "Tanit". Matho and Spendius steal the Zaïmph. Because Matho is caught while breaking into Salammbô's bedroom to see her again, she falls under suspicion of complicity.
 Chapter 6. "Hanno". The mercenaries leave Carthage and split into two groups, attacking Utica and Hippo-Zarytus. Hanno surprises Spendius at Utica, and occupies the city, but flees when Matho arrives and routs his troops.
 Chapter 7. "Hamilcar Barca". The hero returns and an attempt is made to blame him for Hanno's losses. He defends himself before the Council and defends the mercenaries, but turns against the barbarians when he sees the damage they have done to his property.
 Chapter 8. "The Battle of the Macar". Hamilcar defeats Spendius at the bridge of the Macar, three miles from Utica.
 Chapter 9. "In the Field". Hamilcar's troops are trapped by the mercenaries.
 Chapter 10. "The Serpent". Schahabarim sends Salammbô in disguise to retrieve the Zaïmph.
 Chapter 11. "In the Tent". Salammbô reaches Matho in his tent at the encampment. Believing each other to be divine apparitions, they make love. The mercenaries are attacked and dispersed by Hamilcar's troops. She takes away the Zaïmph, and on meeting her father, Hamilcar has her betrothed to Narr' Havas, a mercenary who has changed sides.
 Chapter 12. "The Aqueduct". The Carthaginians return to their city with the mercenaries in pursuit. Spendius cuts off the water supply to Carthage.
 Chapter 13. "Moloch". Carthaginian children are sacrificed to Moloch. Hamilcar disguises a slave-child as his son Hannibal and sends him to die in his son's place.
 Chapter 14. "The Defile of the Axe". The drought is broken and aid comes. Hamilcar drives the mercenaries away from their encampments. Later, thousands of mercenaries are trapped in a defile and slowly starve (the Battle of "The Saw"). Deaths of Hanno and Spendius, both by crucifixion.
 Chapter 15. "Matho". Victory celebrations at Carthage. Matho is tortured before his execution; Salammbô, witnessing this, dies of shock.  The Zaïmph has brought death upon those who touched it.

Characters
The transliterations follow J. W. Matthews' English version.

 Abdalonim, the overseer of Hamilcar's stewards
 Autharitus (Autharite), a Gallic leader of the Mercenaries
 Demonades, a servant of Hanno
 Giddenem, the governor of Hamilcar's slaves
 Gisco (Gesco), a Carthaginian general
 Hamilcar Barca (Amilcar), Carthaginian general who led the mercenaries before the events of the book
 Hannibal, Hamilcar's young son
 Hanno (Hannon), a Carthaginian general (based on Hanno the Great and the Hannibal of the Mercenary War)
 Iddibal, a servant of Hamilcar
 Matho (or Mâthos), a Libyan leader of the Mercenaries
 Narr' Havas (Flaubert's spelling of Naravas), prince of the Numidians, and a leader of the Mercenaries
 Salammbô, daughter of Hamilcar
 Schahabarim, high priest of Tanith, and teacher of Salammbô
 Spendius, a slave of Hamilcar, captured at the battle of Argunisae, who becomes a leader of the Mercenaries during the Revolt
 Taanach, a slave attending Salammbô
 Zarxas (Zarzas), a leader of the Mercenaries from the Balearic Isles

Quotations 
The opening passage:

The description of child sacrifice in chapter 13:

Historical inaccuracies 

Flaubert departed from the Greek historian Polybius' account of the Punic Wars when it suited his purposes. Though the mercenaries had executed a Carthaginian general named Hannibal, Flaubert did not want to contribute to confusion of that Hannibal with the far more familiar Hannibal who commanded the military forces of Carthage in the Second Punic War in the 3rd century BCE. He therefore changed the name of his character to Hanno, the name of other Carthaginian military figures of less prominence.

Work

Work 

 Salammbô, first edition translated by Eleanor Marx (1862)

Adaptations

Musical 
 Salammbô, an unfinished opera by Modest Mussorgsky (1863–66)
 Salammbô, an unfinished opera by Sergei Rachmaninoff
 Salammbô, an opera composed by Ernest Reyer based on Flaubert's novel (1890).
 Salammbo (Florent Schmitt): Three orchestral suites op. 76, from the music for the 1925 film by Pierre Maradon
 Salammbo, an opera composed by Josef Matthias Hauer based on Flaubert's novel (1929).
 Salammbô, an opera by the French composer Philippe Fénelon, on a libretto by Jean-Yves Masson after Flaubert (1998)

Film 
 Cabiria, a 1914 Italian silent film by Giovanni Pastrone
 Salambò, a 1915 Italian silent film by Domenico Gaido, released in Italy in October 1914. First U.S. release on 3 March 1915
 Salammbô, a 1925 silent film by Pierre Marodon, with music by Florent Schmitt
 The Loves of Salammbo, a 1962 sword and sandal film by Sergio Grieco
 In Orson Welles' film Citizen Kane, Charles Foster Kane's wife Susan sings the title role of Salambo in a fictitious opera; the aria shown in the film was composed by Bernard Herrmann.

Other 
 Salammbo, a play by Charles Ludlam (1988)
 Salammbô, a series of science fiction graphic novels by Phillippe Druillet (1980, 1982, 1986)
 Salammbo: Battle for Carthage is the title of a Windows game by Dreamcatcher Interactive with artwork by Druillet.  Its story is based on both Gustave Flaubert's and Phillipe Druillet's works (2003)
 "Salammbô" (1999) and "Salambô Redux" (2007), short stories by Caitlín R. Kiernan (1999)
 The Adventures of Alix, a historical comics series by Jacques Martin, inspired by the novel
 The Musée des Beaux-Arts in Rouen mounted an exhibition in 2021 called "Salambô: Fureurs! Passion! Éléphants!".

In art

References

Additional sources

External links

Texts
  (French)
  (English)
Audio
 
 Jolly Roger: Salammbô Gustave Flaubert
 ClassicReader.com Salammbô
 Arthur's Classic Novels: Salammbô by Gustave Flaubert
 World Wide School: Salammbô by Gustave Flaubert

1862 French novels
Carthage
Child sacrifice
French historical novels
Novels adapted into comics
French novels adapted into films
French novels adapted into plays
Mercenary War
Novels adapted into operas
Novels by Gustave Flaubert
Novels set in ancient Rome
Novels set in the 3rd century BC
Phoenicia in fiction
Punic Wars